The 2009 FA Community Shield (also known as The FA Community Shield sponsored by McDonald's for sponsorship reasons) was the 87th FA Community Shield, an annual football match contested by the winners of the previous season's Premier League and FA Cup competitions. The match was contested at Wembley Stadium, London, on 9 August 2009, and contested by 2008–09 Premier League champions Manchester United, and Chelsea as the winners of the 2008–09 FA Cup, a repeat of the 2007 match. The game ended in a 2–2 draw – the goals coming from Nani and Wayne Rooney for Manchester United, and from Ricardo Carvalho and Frank Lampard for Chelsea – with Chelsea winning 4–1 on penalties.

This was also the first time since 1998 that Chelsea had won a professional match on penalties; The last instance was a League Cup quarter-final against Ipswich Town.

Match details

See also

2008–09 Premier League
2008–09 FA Cup

References

2009
Fa Community Shield
Fa Community Shield
Fa Community Shield
Charity Shield 2009
Charity Shield 2009
Fa Community Shield 2009
Events at Wembley Stadium